Reynesoceras is genus of ammonites that lived during the upper Pliensbachian stage of early Jurassic. It has evolved from Prodactylioceras, or Cetonoceras. Dactylioceras (Eodactylites) has probably evolved from this genus. Aveyroniceras is a name for macroconchs of this genus. Their fossils were found in Europe, northern Africa, Asia, North America and South America.

Description
Ammonites of this genus had shells with depressed whorl section and single, coarse ribs. Ribs are crossing venter, but there is no bifurcation, which is often present on other genera belonging to Dactylioceratidae. Also, there are no tubercules, which is a thing that differs them from Tokurites.

Distribution
British Columbia, Chile, Hungary, Italy and Morocco

References

Dactylioceratidae
Ammonites of Africa
Ammonites of Asia
Ammonites of North America
Ammonites of South America
Ammonitida genera
Jurassic ammonites